Mi Vida Loca (also known as My Crazy Life) is a 1993 American drama film directed and written by Allison Anders. It centers on the plight of cholas (the female counterparts to cholos) growing up in the Echo Park section of Los Angeles, who face the struggles of friendship, romantic entanglements, motherhood, and gang membership. The story follows interlocking stories of several female gang members while centering on the friendship between two friends who become involved with the same man.

With the exception of the lead characters, the cast consisted of unknown actors, some of whom were actual gang members from Echo Park. It also marks the first film appearances of Salma Hayek and Jason Lee, in small roles.

Plot
In Echo Park, Los Angeles, a neighborhood that has seen a significant amount of gang activity over the past decade, two young Mexican-American women, friends since childhood, join the local gang. They are each given the gang names Mousie and Sad Girl, names which are handed down from one generation to the next. Mousie and Sad Girl pride themselves for remaining loyal to each other and their gang, but their friendship becomes fractured when they both fall for gangster Ernesto, a.k.a. Bullet. Ernesto eventually bears a child with both women, leading them to become rivals, and also turns to drug-dealing for financial support. Other plot lines involve La Blue Eyes, Sad Girl's college-bound sister; Whisper, who learns the drug-dealing ropes from Ernesto; and Giggles, who is fresh out of prison after doing time for a crime committed by her boyfriend. When Ernesto is killed in a drug deal gone wrong, Sad Girl and Mousie realize they must put betrayals, heartbreak and tragedies behind them if they hope to rise above their situations.

Cast

Production
Allison Anders was inspired to write Mi Vida Loca after moving to Echo Park in 1986 and becoming acquainted with members of the local gang, Echo Park Locas. Anders said,

Rodrigo García was the film's cinematographer. 

The film is dedicated to the memory of Nica Rogers, a member of the Echo Park Locas who appears briefly in the film and died after filming concluded. After the movie's release, Anders and Film Independent established a scholarship program to help assist the kids of Echo Park with higher education.

Soundtrack

A soundtrack containing hip hop and contemporary R&B was released on March 8, 1994 by Mercury Records. It peaked at 70 on the Top R&B/Hip-Hop Albums.

Critical reception
Mi Vida Loca received positive reviews from critics. Review aggregator Rotten Tomatoes reports that the film has earned a 74% based on 23 reviews, with an average rating of 6.4 out of 10.

Critic Roger Ebert awarded the film 3 out of 4 stars. Though he said the film's story lacked structure and felt it "is more anecdotal than involving", he noted, "what we do get is a vivid impression of these young women and their world, and an understanding of how the gang performs a social function [in that world] that otherwise would be missing. Perhaps in not forming into a story, the movie does a service, by not forcing a conclusion where none should exist. The gangs have no beginning or end. They exist, and continue, as new faces appear and old ones disappear for good reasons and bad."

In a positive review, The Buffalo News wrote the film captures a world "where romantic dreams, friendships, codes of honor, and ambitions are played out with every bit of the intensity found just a few dozen blocks away [in Hollywood], in million-dollar neighborhoods packed with moguls and stars. Yet for all its gritty realism, Mi Vida Loca is not so much a gang story as it is a love story, crammed with the romance that fuels these girls' relationships with each other, their babies and their men."

Emanuel Levy credited Anders with avoiding "sensationalism or condescension", saying, "To her credit, Anders doesn’t patronize the Latino community with another stereotypical portrait. 'The last thing I wanted,' Anders declared in a manifesto, 'and certainly the last thing these kids needed was to be colonized by a white liberal, preaching a point of view that hands out easy solutions.'" However, Levy, as well as Todd McCarthy of Variety, felt the film also "lacks a discernible point of view."

Year-end lists 
 Honorable mention – Duane Dudek, Milwaukee Sentinel

See also 
 List of hood films

References

External links
 
 
 
 

1993 films
1993 drama films
1993 independent films
American buddy drama films
British buddy drama films
1990s female buddy films
Films directed by Allison Anders
Films shot in Los Angeles
Films set in Los Angeles
American gang films
Hood films
American independent films
Films about Mexican Americans
British independent films
1990s gang films
Sony Pictures Classics films
1990s English-language films
1990s American films
1990s British films